Adeorbis elegans is a species of very small sea snail with a translucent shell, a marine gastropod mollusk in the family Tornidae.

References

External links 

 
 

Tornidae
Gastropods described in 1850